is a village located in Fukushima Prefecture, Japan. , the village had an estimated population of 8,781, and a population density of 110 persons per km2 in 2896 households. In 2016, Ōtama was selected as one of The Most Beautiful Villages in Japan.

Geography
Ōtama is located in north-central Fukushima prefecture, sandwiched between the cities of Kōriyama and Nihonmatsu.

Lakes: Miharu Dam
Mountains: Mount Adatara (1728m)
Rivers: Abukuma River

Neighboring municipalities
 Fukushima Prefecture
 Kōriyama
 Nihonmatsu
 Motomiya

Demographics
Per Japanese census data, the population of Ōtama peaked around the year 1950 but has remained relatively steady over the past 50 years.

Climate
Ōtama has a humid continental climate (Köppen Cfa) characterized by mild summers and cold winters with heavy snowfall.  The average annual temperature in Ōtama is 10.8 °C. The average annual rainfall is 1288 mm with September as the wettest month. The temperatures are highest on average in August, at around 24.0 °C, and lowest in January, at around -1.2 °C.

History
The area of present-day Ōtama was part of ancient Mutsu Province and the area has many burial mounds from the Kofun period. The area formed part of the holdings of Nihonmatsu Domain during the Edo period. After the Meiji Restoration, it was organized as part of Nakadōri region of Iwaki Province, administratively within Adachi District. The villages of Oyama and Tamanoi were established on April 1, 1899 with the creation of the modern municipalities system. Ōtama Village was formed on March 31, 1955 with the merger of the two villages.

Economy
The economy of Ōtama is primarily agricultural.

Education
Ōtama has two public elementary schools and one public junior high school operated by the village government. The village does not have a high school.
 Ōtama Middle School
 Ōtama Oyama Elementary School
 Ōtama Tamanoi Elementary School

Transportation

Railway
Ōtama is not served by any passenger railway service, although the Tohoku Main Line passes through the village.

Highway

International relations
 - Machu Picchu, Peru, friendship city since December 26, 2015

References

External links

Villages in Fukushima Prefecture
Otama, Fukushima